The Government of National Unity (Hukumat al Wahdat al Watania) is a provisional government for Libya formed on 10 March 2021 to unify the rival Government of National Accord based in Tripoli and the Second Al-Thani Cabinet, based in Tobruk. Abdul Hamid Dbeibeh is the Prime Minister of the unity government and was selected in the Libyan Political Dialogue Forum on 5 February 2021. It is de facto backed by the governments of Turkey, Qatar , Algeria, Pakistan and Palestine.

Creation
Abdul Hamid Dbeibeh was selected as Prime Minister by the Libyan Political Dialogue Forum (LPDF), together with Mohamed al-Menfi as Chairman of the Presidential Council, Musa al-Koni and Abdullah al-Lafi as Presidential Council members. Dbeibeh was required under the agreements made by the LPDF to nominate a cabinet of ministers to the House of Representatives (HoR) by 26 February 2021.

On 15 February, Dbeibeh stated his intention to contact people in all 13 electoral areas of Libya for discussing proposed nominations as ministers, and for the cabinet to represent a cross-section of Libyans. The LPDF rules state that if Dbeibeh fails to present his proposed cabinet to the HoR by 26 February, or the HoR does not approve the proposed cabinet, then decision-making returns to the LPDF. Dbeibeh said the following day that he would consult with the High Council of State, the HoR and the 5+5 Libyan Joint Military Commission.

On 15 February, about 20 HoR members were present at an HoR session held in Tobruk, chaired by Aguila Saleh Issa in the "eastern" component of the HoR; 70 HoR members were present at Sabratha, the HoR session of the "western" component. The Tobruk bloc called for GNU offices to be located in Sirte and for the HoR to hold a special session for approving the proposed GNU cabinet. According to the Libya Herald, the two branches of the HoR remained in competition with one another.

On 10 March 2021, the House of Representatives met in the central city of Sirte and approved with a 121–11 vote the formation of the Government of National Unity led by Mohamed al-Menfi as chairman of the Presidential Council and Abdul Hamid Dbeibeh as Prime Minister.

The House of Representatives, which rules eastern Libya, passed a no-confidence motion against the unity government on 21 September 2021. On 3 March 2022 a rival Government of National Stability was installed in Sirte, under the leadership of Prime Minister Fathi Bashagha. The decision was denounced as illegitimate by the High Council of State and condemned by the United Nations.

Both governments have been functioning simultaneously, which has led to dual power in Libya. The Libyan Political Dialogue Forum keeps corresponding with ceasefire agreement. Since May, there have been clashes between supporters of the two governments in Libya, which escalated on August 27.

Dbeibeh cabinet

A list of members of Dbeibeh's cabinet was released on 11 March 2021.

References

Government of Libya
Politics of Libya
Current governments